Maíra Charken Carneiro (born July 22, 1978) is a Dutch Brazilian actress, dancer, singer, TV host and comedian.

Biography
Maíra Charken was born in Amsterdam, Netherlands. She went to Brazil at the age of two, where she settled with her family in Campinas, in the state of São Paulo.

Formed in Journalism by PUC-Campinas and Dance by Unicamp. It is part of the comedy group  Deznecessários  and was part of the musical group Blitz. Participated in the reality show Popstars of SBT, being among the finalists. He joined the cast of the telenovela Babilônia, of Rede Globo, playing the delegated Vera Morgado. From March 14, 2016, assumes as new host of the program Video Show instead of Joaquim Lopes replacing Monica Iozzi. In January 26, 2017, Maíra was fired from the broadcaster; in May of the same year, she launched a YouTube channel.

Maíra has a degree in journalism from the Pontifical Catholic University of Campinas (PUC). Married to athlete Renato Antunes since September 2017, and mother of little Gael.

Filmography

Television

Movies 
 2003 - Retratos da Vida (short film)
 2009 - Drinks Desejos Desvios (short film)

Theater 
 2001 - O Abobalhado
 2004 - Evita Perón como Evita
 2004 - Gatas Manhosas
 2005 - O Manipulador
 2005 - Sabor a Mi
 2005 - Gardel
 2007 - O Homem Ideal
 2007 - O Musical dos Musicais
 2008 - Nós Amamos
 2014 - Elis a Musical

Others 
 Interview on Hebe of Hebe Camargo
 Participation on Teleton, of SBT
 Fixed comedy group cast Deznecessários
 Stand-Up in People&Arts channel
 Interview on Radiofobia podcast

References

External links

1978 births
Living people
Actresses from Amsterdam
Dutch people of Brazilian descent
Dutch emigrants to Brazil
Actresses from Rio de Janeiro (city)
Brazilian people of Dutch descent
Brazilian journalists
Brazilian women comedians
Brazilian female dancers
Brazilian film actresses
Brazilian television actresses
Brazilian telenovela actresses
21st-century Brazilian singers
21st-century Brazilian women singers